Boologooroo Station, commonly referred to as Boologooroo, is a pastoral lease that operates as a sheep station in Western Australia.

Description
The station is bordered to the south by Boolathana Station, to the north by Minilya Station and to the east by Cooralya Station. Lake MacLeod forms the western boundary of the station.

It has a carrying capacity of 10,500 sheep. The country is mostly alluvial plains with duplex soils and many sandy rises. The vegetation is mixed shrubland of currant bush, many acacias and some Gascoyne bluebush. The western portion of the station is made up of flat, saline alluvial plains that support salt bush, blue bush and taller acacia species.

History
Boologoroo was established in 1894 by Robert Campbell. Campbell had previously taken up Beringarra Station in 1881 before acquiring Boologooroo. By 1906 the property was owned by Harry Campbell. Robert Campbell died of heart failure in 1909 and Harry took full ownership of Boologooroo.

In 1923 the area was struck by a cyclone, with Boologooroo receiving  over a few days.

The body of Jack Smith was found in the woolshed in an advanced state of decomposition in 1932. Smith had enquired about work of the station but then committed suicide in the shed.

In 2018 Boologooroo was sold to Gordon Cattle Company.

See also
 List of pastoral leases in Western Australia

References

Shire of Carnarvon
Stations (Australian agriculture)
Pastoral leases in Western Australia
1894 establishments in Australia